Lim O-Kyeong (born December 11, 1971), also spelled as Im Oh-Gyeong, is a South Korean politician who previously competed in three Olympics as a South Korean handball player.

Sports and Education 
At the 1992 Summer Olympics in Barcelona, she was part of the South Korea national team which won the gold medal. She played all five matches and scored 30 goals.

In 1994 she moved to Japan to play for the Hiroshima Maple Reds. In 1996 she became a player-manager and led her team to a Japan Handball League championship.

At the 1996 Summer Olympics in Atlanta, she won the silver medal as member of the South Korean team. She played all five matches and scored 41 goals.

Lim was voted World Handball Player of the Year 1996 by the International Handball Federation.

In 2004, she won the silver medal again at the Athens Olympics. At the competition she played all seven matches and scored 14 goals.

In July 2008 she was hired as Seoul City Hall Handball Club's player-manager becoming the first woman to coach a professional Ball game team in South Korea.

She completed her tertiary education at Korea National Sport University in Seoul for undergraduate, master's and doctorate degrees.

Politics 
She previously sat as a board member of Korean Sport & Olympic Committee and a non-executive director of government-funded Korea Sports Promotion Foundation.

For the 2020 general election, she was approached and recruited by the ruling Democratic Party. She revealed that President Moon Jae-in inspired her decision on the political party.

Electoral history

Awards 
  Order of Sports Merit by the government of South Korea (1992)

References

External links

1971 births
Living people
South Korean female handball players
Olympic handball players of South Korea
Handball players at the 1992 Summer Olympics
Handball players at the 1996 Summer Olympics
Handball players at the 2004 Summer Olympics
Olympic gold medalists for South Korea
Olympic silver medalists for South Korea
Olympic medalists in handball
Medalists at the 2004 Summer Olympics
Medalists at the 1996 Summer Olympics
Medalists at the 1992 Summer Olympics
People from Jeongeup
Minjoo Party of Korea politicians
21st-century South Korean women politicians
21st-century South Korean politicians
21st-century South Korean women
Members of the National Assembly (South Korea)
Female members of the National Assembly (South Korea)
Sportsperson-politicians